Monterey Bay Football Club (Monterey Bay F.C.) is an American professional soccer team based in Monterey County, California. The club was established on February 21, 2021, and is a member of the USL Championship, the second tier of the American soccer league system. It began playing during the 2022 USL Championship season as a member of the league's Western Conference.

History

Former Monterey Bay teams 
The Monterey Bay had its first professional team in 1993 when Santa Cruz Surf joined the USISL. The team would only last through the 1994 season, but professional soccer's absence would not last long as the Monterey Bay Jaguars were established for the 1995 season. The following season the Jaguars would change the location in their name to "California" and have their most successful season, defeating the Richmond Kickers 2-1 to win the USISL Select League Championship. The Jaguars would continue to play in USL affiliated leagues until their folding after the 1999 USL D3 Pro League season.

National club soccer would not return to the Monterey Bay until 2004, when the Salinas Valley Samba joined the Men's Premier Soccer League for its second season. The 2007 NPSL season would see two Monterey Bay teams playing in the same league, with the Santa Cruz County Breakers established. However this would not last long, as the Breakers would fold their NPSL club in 2008. The Samba themselves would fold the following year, with the 2009 season being their last. In 2018, a decade after the initial Breakers team folded, the club reestablished their first-team side and joined the USL PDL under the name Santa Cruz Breakers FC.

From Fresno to the Monterey Bay 
Monterey Bay F.C. is a continuation of the USL Championship's former Fresno FC franchise. The team, owned by Ray Beshoff, ceased operations after the 2019 season because he was unable to secure construction of a soccer-specific stadium. Beshoff retained the franchise rights and started a search for another place in California to relocate. On February 1, 2021, Monterey Bay F.C. joined the USL Championship. The club's Sporting Director is two-time MLS Coach of the Year, Frank Yallop. Yallop had previously served as General Manager of Fresno FC. In April 2021, former San Jose Earthquakes captain, Ramiro Corrales, joined the team staff as a technical advisor. Corrales, a native of Salinas, began and ended his playing career in the Monterey Bay Area. His career began with the Monterey Bay Jaguars in 1995 before joining the San Jose Clash (later renamed "Earthquakes") in 1996. He last served as a player-coach with Santa Cruz Breakers during the 2018 USL PDL season. General manager Frank Yallop was also named Head Coach on April 22, 2021, with Ramiro Corrales named as Assistant Coach.

The club signed their first player, Walmer Martinez, on December 22, 2021. Born in Santa Cruz, Martinez returned to play professionally at the same campus he had played collegiately with CSUMB. The Union finished their inaugural season in 12th place, second to last in the Western Conference.

On February 6, 2023, the club announced Monterey Bay F.C. 2, a development team joining USL League Two. The team will begin play in the summer of 2023 and be based in Salinas, California. The head coach will be current Monterey Bay F.C. assistant coach Ramiro Corrales, who will take on the role in addition to his first team duties. Mark Christie will serve as his assistant coach. The team will play four of their six home matches at Rabobank Stadium and the remaining two matches at the senior team's home, Cardinale Stadium in Seaside, California.

Alex Dixon scored the club's first ever hat trick in the 2023 USL Championship season opener against Hartford Athletic. The hat trick's first goal featured the fastest goal in club history (91 seconds) and the third goal was the first penalty scored by the club. His performance also earned him USL Championship Player of the Week honors, another first for a player from the club.

Stadium
Monterey Bay F.C. plays their games at what was Freeman Stadium on the campus of California State University, Monterey Bay. The stadium was renovated with private funds and holds 6,000 fans. Ground breaking for the stadium renovations took place on September 16, 2021. The team entered into a multi-year partnership with the Cardinale Automotive Group for the stadium naming rights. The venue was renamed Cardinale Stadium, which opened on May 7, 2022.

Colors and badge

Monterey Bay Football Club's official colors are Crisp Blue, Kelp Blue and White.

Sponsorship

Players

Current roster

Staff

Team records

Year-by-year

Head coaches
 Includes USL Regular Season, USL Playoffs, U.S. Open Cup. Excludes friendlies.

References

External links
 

Soccer clubs in California
Association football clubs established in 2021
USL Championship teams
2021 establishments in California
Sports in Monterey County, California
Monterey Bay FC